Henry Burgess Crosby (9 March 1870 – 24 June 1949) was an Australian politician who represented the South Australian House of Assembly multi-member seat of Barossa from 1917 to 1924, 1924 to 1930 and 1933 to 1938 for the Liberal Union, Liberal Federation and Liberal and Country League.

Crosby failed to be re-elected at the 1924 election held on 5 April. He returned to parliament later in the year as the result of the by-election held on 22 November following the death of William Hague.

References

1870 births
1949 deaths
Members of the South Australian House of Assembly
Liberal and Country League politicians